Tongue thrust (also called reverse swallow or immature swallow) is a pseudo-pathological name of what is either considered a normal adaptive lip seal mechanism, whereby normal nasal breathing or normal swallowing can occur. Or, it is seen as an oral myofunctional disorder - a tongue muscle pattern that is perceived as clinically abnormal and in which the tongue protrudes anteriorly to seal otherwise incompetent lips.

Tongue thrusting is only seen during speech, swallowing or eating, and in order to close otherwise incompetent lips on background of an almost ubiquitous small lower jaw and anterior open bite. The behaviour is apparent only during a normal awake state, and whilst the tongue (and rest of the body) is in normal resting tone. By descriptive inference, tongue thrusting is impossible during deep sleep, or non-tone phases; or in particular during non-conscious states.

Nearly all infants exhibit a swallowing pattern involving forward tongue tip push as part of infant suckling behaviour . By six months of age most lose the forward extent of this push once paediatric  incisal teeth erupt, and normal lip seal is automatically acquired as solid foods begin.

There are thus two community and clinical professional views of the observation of tongue thrusting behaviour that persists past the neonatal period.

1. Either it is a normal adaptive means of closing an open (or incompetent) lip state, caused by a unique combination of anatomical reasons, or

2. Tongue thrusting is the cause or potentiator of an open or incompetent lip state, and which resists efforts at behavioural change or clinical attempt at remedy.

In generality, tongue thrusting is poorly understood. In particular it lacks consensus on many points of description, causality, effect or management and between the various clinical groups that each offer different forms of treatments or philosophies of professional interest.

The classical view of tongue thrusting  
Since 1958, the term "tongue thrust" has been described and discussed in speech and orthodontic (dental) publications and by a range of writers - and speaking from specific non-medical professional perspectives and clinical biases - as a pathological event that exists as an entity for itself and without fundamental or primary functional or necessary cause.

Both the general dental and speech pathologist classical views are that tongue thrusting causes both the dentofacial abnormality of anterior open bite, and the  incompetent lip seal and swallowing and speech effects associated with tongue thrust.

In both professions, tongue thrust is represented as a behavioural disturbance which can be taught to be resisted. Such interventional therapy is represented to strongly assist orthodontic or speech pathologist efforts at resolution of both the speech and orthodontic effects of anterior open bite and the associated lip incompetence of both.

As with normal reflexes, most school-age children have tongue thrust if looked for. For example, according to recent literature, as many as 67–95 percent of children 5–8 years old exhibit tongue thrust, which may professionally be represented as associated with or contributing to an orthodontic or speech problem - depending on the clinical bias of proposal. Up to the age of four, as with the complex conversion of all simpler reflex events, there is a possibility that any observed child will normally outgrow tongue thrust as they transition to a fuller dentofacial development. However, if a tongue thrust pattern is retained beyond infancy, it can be seen through a lens of abnormality, and this vulnerable to clinical bias and attempts to clinically interact.

Types of tongue thrusting include:
Anterior thrust
This is the most common type of tongue thrust. It is often associated with a low, forward tongue rest posture. Sometimes the tongue can be seen protruding beyond the lips at rest and/or during the swallow. Upper incisors can be extremely protruded and the lower incisors are pulled in by the lower lip. An anterior open bite is a common malocclusion associated with this type of tongue thrusting pattern, especially in the presence of lip incompetence. This type of thrust is most generally accompanied by a strong mentalis. 
Unilateral thrust
This occurs when the tongue pushes unilaterally to the side between the back teeth during the swallow. The bite can be characteristically open on that side.
Bilateral thrust
This occurs when the tongue pushes between the back teeth on both sides during the swallow with the jaw partially or subtly open. 
Sometimes, the only teeth that touch are the molars, with the bite completely open on both sides including the anterior teeth. A large tongue can also be noted. This is the most difficult thrust to correct.

Causes 
Factors that can contribute to tongue thrusting include macroglossia (enlarged tongue), thumb sucking, large tonsils, hereditary factors, ankyloglossia (tongue tie), and certain types of artificial nipples used in feeding infants, also allergies or nasal congestion can cause the tongue to lie low in the mouth because of breathing obstruction and finally contributing to tongue thrusting.

Effects 
Tongue extrusion is normal in infants.

Tongue thrusting can adversely affect the teeth and mouth. If a person has tongue thrusting, this continuous pressure tends to force the teeth out of alignment. People who exhibit a tongue thrust often present with open bites; the force of the tongue against the teeth is an important factor in contributing to "bad bite" (malocclusion). Many orthodontists have completed dental treatment with what appeared to be good results, only to discover that the case relapsed because of the patient's tongue thrust. If the tongue is allowed to continue its pushing action against the teeth, it will continue to push the teeth forward and reverse the orthodontic work.

Speech may be affected by a tongue thrust swallowing pattern.

Chewing and swallowing with dysfunctional muscle patterning (as in a tongue thrust) is not as effective as a normal chewing and swallowing motion.

Treatment
Treatment options for tongue thrust may include orthodontic spikes, prongs or other tongue reminders, which redirect the tongue rest posture and swallow. Orofacial myofunctional therapists teach oral rest posture and chewing/swallowing mechanics without appliances.

See also
 Orofacial myological disorders

References

Speech and language pathology
Tongue disorders